The term Variable Control Voice Actuator (VCVA) refers to a digital recording technology developed by Olympus, which is implemented in many of their digital voice recorders. It prevents the recording of silence, so pauses in a speaker's dictation do not waste time, power or recording space.

Function 
When the microphone picks up an arbitrary level of sound, the VCVA initiates recording, and when volume detected by that microphone dips down below said threshold the VCVA stops recording.

References 

Digital audio recording